Sigurður Bergmann (born 9 March 1961) is an Icelandic judoka. He competed at the 1988 Summer Olympics and the 1992 Summer Olympics.

References

1961 births
Living people
Icelandic male judoka
Olympic judoka of Iceland
Judoka at the 1988 Summer Olympics
Judoka at the 1992 Summer Olympics
Place of birth missing (living people)